The Australian Values Party is a minor political party founded on 19 January 2022 by ADF veteran Heston Russell. The party's main focus is veterans' rights, although it has policy positions on other subjects as well.

History
The Australian Values Party (AVP) was registered by the Australian Electoral Commission as a political party on 18 January 2022, after applying for registration on 17 September 2021. The Australian Values Party fielded candidates in the 2022 Australian federal election.

In August 2022, the AVP announced the Angry Victorians Party would contest the Victorian state election as a branch of the party. Independent Member for the Western Metropolitan Region, Catherine Cumming, joined the party in November after having her application to register the Independence Party refused. On 16 November 2022, party leader Heston Russell leaked a video to the Herald Sun of him to talking to Glenn Druery about a potential preference deal, declaring that the AVP felt the co-ordination of the group voting ticket system used by Druery was immoral and needed to be exposed.

Policies
The party has been focused on policies supporting disaster relief, defence and veterans’ affairs, and a heavy health & mental health focus. Party leader Heston Russell has been at the forefront of campaigning on Veterans’ Affairs policy since 2020.

See also

List of political parties in Australia

References

External links

2021 establishments in Australia
Political parties established in 2021
Political parties in Australia
Populist parties
Australian veterans' organisations